The Norwegian Minister of Auditing was the head of the Norwegian Ministry of Auditing. The position existed from 1822 to 1918.

List of Norwegian Ministers of Auditing

References
Ministry of Auditing. Councillor of State 1822 - 1918

Auditing
1822 establishments in Norway